Roberto Bordin (born 10 January 1965 in Zawiya, Libya) is a retired Italian footballer, who played as a midfielder, and current manager of Sheriff Tiraspol.

Career
Bordin began his career in the lower leagues, playing for Sanremese, Taranto and Parma before joining Cesena with whom he won promotion to Serie A in 1987. He later played for Atalanta, Napoli and Piacenza in Serie A, before moving to the lower leagues to join Triestina. He spent the later years of his career at Spezia, with the exception of a season with Vicenza.

Adept in either midfield or defence, he would become noted for his longevity as a professional footballer. He finished his career with Spezia in 2005.

Since then, he started a career into management, serving as Andrea Mandorlini's assistant during his spells at Bologna, Padova, Siena, Sassuolo, CFR Cluj and, most recently, Verona.

On 8 March 2016, he became the manager of Triestina. On 5 October 2016, he became the manager of Sheriff Tiraspol in Moldova's National Division.

On 8 June 2018, Bordin was announced as Neftchi Bakus new manager on a two-year contract. On 18 of January 2020 the club announced the end of the contract.

On 12 February 2021 he was announced as the new manager of the Moldova national football team.

On 9 January 2023, Sheriff Tiraspol announced the return of Bordin.

Managerial statistics

Honours

Player

Manager
Sheriff Tiraspol
Moldovan National Division (2): 2016–17, 2017
Moldovan Cup (1): 2016-2017
Moldovan Super Cup (1) : 2017

Individual

Player

Manager
Divizia Națională Coach of the year: 2017

References

External links
Career Stats

1965 births
Living people
Italian footballers
Serie A players
Serie B players
Atalanta B.C. players
S.S.C. Napoli players
Spezia Calcio players
U.S. Triestina Calcio 1918 players
L.R. Vicenza players
Taranto F.C. 1927 players
Piacenza Calcio 1919 players
Parma Calcio 1913 players
S.S.D. Sanremese Calcio players
U.S. Triestina Calcio 1918 managers
People from Zawiya District
Italian football managers
Italian expatriate football managers
Expatriate football managers in Moldova
Italian expatriate sportspeople in Moldova
Association football midfielders
FC Sheriff Tiraspol managers
Moldovan Super Liga managers
Libyan people of Italian descent